La Preneuse is a public beach in western coast of the island Mauritius in the district of Rivière Noire located in the village of Black River. It was named after a French ship, the frigate Preneuse, which served as a commerce raider at Isle de France (as Mauritius was then known) and was also involved in a naval battle with the British in the 18th century. The beach is home to the best preserved Martello tower in Mauritius.

References

Beaches of Mauritius